Adam at 6 A.M. is a 1970 American drama film directed by Robert Scheerer. It stars Michael Douglas, Lee Purcell, Joe Don Baker, Louise Latham, Charles Aidman, Grayson Hall, Marge Redmond, and Dana Elcar. The film did not receive much attention when it was released.  The film was filmed almost entirely on location in the small Midwest town of Excelsior Springs, Missouri, as well as Cameron, Missouri and Orrick, Missouri.

Premise
Adam Gaines, a semantics professor at UCLA, becomes complacent in his life and hears about the death of a relative in Missouri.  He drives cross country to attend the funeral and pay his respects, and decides to spend the summer there working as a laborer.  He meets Jerri Jo Hopper, and falls in love, along the way developing new friendships with the town locals.  He then must decide what direction he wants his life to go, whether to stay in Missouri or return to California.

Cast
 Michael Douglas as Adam Gaines
 Lee Purcell as Jerri Jo Hopper
 Joe Don Baker as Harvey Gavin
 Louise Latham as Verna Hopper
 Charles Aidman as Harry Hopper
 Grayson Hall as Inez Treadley
 Marge Redmond as Cleo
 Dana Elcar as Van Treadley
 Ed Call as Orville
 Carolyn Conwell as Mavis
 Butch Youngblood as Elwood
 Greg Joseph as Ed
 Timothy Blake as Girl at Party
 Richard Derr as Roger Gaines
 Pat Randal as Pearlie
 Jo Ella Deffenbaugh as Marylist
 Sharon Marshall as Rosalie
 David Sullivan as Leroy
 Del Monroe as Mutt Peavine
 Meg Foster as Joyce
 Anne Gwynne as Gladys Gaines
 Ned Wertheimer as Dr. Peters

Production
Steve McQueen's film company, Solar Productions, signed a multi-picture deal with Cinema Center Films. This was its first production.

Michael Douglas got his first paycheck, about $3400, for Adam at 6 A.M. He also received the orange Porsche that he drove in the film directly from Steve McQueen.

See also
 List of American films of 1970

References

External links
 
 
 

1970 films
1970 drama films
American drama films
1970s English-language films
Films about educators
Films directed by Robert Scheerer
Films scored by Dave Grusin
Films set in Missouri
Films shot in Missouri
Cinema Center Films films
1970 directorial debut films
1970s American films